Simeon or Simyon Simev (born 30 May 1949 in Štip) is a poet, essayist and journalist in North Macedonia.

Biography
Simev studied history with history of arts at the Sts. Cyril and Methodius University in Skopje. He worked as a high school teacher, associate at the Ministry of Culture, journalist in the First Programme and editor in chief of Radio Culture (formerly known as Third Programme) in the Macedonian Radio.

Simev has published poetry, essays, studies in newspapers, magazines and periodical publications. His poetry has been published in Bulgaria and Germany.

Works
 Соспи (Snow drift). Skopje: Tabernakul, 1997. 68 pp. .
 Месечина огрева, сонце изгрева (The moon shines, the sun rises). Skopje: Nasha kniga, 1999. 66 pp. .
 Дамга (Stain). Skopje: Nasha kniga, 2002. 86 pp. .
 Шарената сенка: живопис, литература, музика (The motley shadow: Painting, Literature, Music). Skopje: Makavej, 2008. 159 pp. .
 Ронливи лета море далечно (Crumbling years faraway sea). Skopje: Simev S., 2010. 76 pp. .

External links
 The official website of Simeon Simev
 Во песокта (In the sand), "Snow drift". 
 Ловци ја крадат ноќта (Huntsmen are hunting the night), "Snow drift". 
 Вермер или исечок од тишината (Vermeer or an excerpt from the silence), "The motley shadow".

References

 
 
 

1949 births
Living people
People from Štip
Macedonian poets
Macedonian essayists
Radio journalists